In physics, theories of gravitation postulate mechanisms of interaction governing the movements of bodies with mass. There have been numerous theories of gravitation since ancient times. The first extant sources discussing such theories are found in ancient Greek philosophy. This work was furthered by ancient Indian, medieval Islamic physicists and European scientists, before gaining great strides during the Renaissance and Scientific Revolution, culminating in the formulation of Newton's law of gravity. This was superseded by Albert Einstein's theory of relativity in the early 20th century.

Greek philosopher Aristotle believed that objects tend toward a point due to their inner gravitas (heaviness). Vitruvius understood that objects fall based on their specific gravity. In the 6th century AD, Byzantine Alexandrian scholar John Philoponus modified the Aristotelian concept of gravity with the theory of impetus. In the 7th century, Indian astronomer Brahmagupta spoke of gravity as an attractive force. In the 14th century, European philosophers Jean Buridan and Albert of Saxony—who were influenced by certain Islamic scholars—developed the theory of impetus and linked it to the acceleration and mass of objects. Albert also developed a law of proportion regarding the relationship between the speed of an object in free fall and the time elapsed.

In the early 17th century, Galileo Galilei found that all objects tend to accelerate equally in free fall. In 1632, he put forth the basic principle of relativity. The existence of the gravitational constant was explored by various researchers from the mid-17th century, helping Isaac Newton formulate his law of universal gravitation. Newton's classical mechanics were superseded in the early 20th century, when Einstein developed the special and general theories of relativity. The hypothetical force carrier of gravity remains an outlier in the search for a theory of everything, for which various models of quantum gravity are candidates.

Antiquity

Greco-Roman world

The Ionian Greek philosopher Heraclitus used the word logos ('word') to describe a kind of law which keeps the cosmos in harmony, moving all objects, including the stars, winds, and waves.

In the 4th century BC, the Greek philosopher and polymath  Aristotle taught that there is no effect or motion without a cause. The cause of the downward motion of heavy bodies, such as the element earth, was related to their nature (gravity), which caused them to move downward toward the Earth's centre, while light bodies such as the element fire, were moved by their nature (levity) upward toward the celestial sphere of the Moon.

The 3rd-century-BC Greek physicist Archimedes discovered the centre of mass of a triangle. He also postulated that if the centres of gravity of two equal weights was not the same, it would be located in the middle of the line that joins them. Two centuries later, the Roman engineer and architect Vitruvius contended in his De architectura that gravity is not dependent on a substance's weight but rather on its 'nature' (cf. specific gravity):

If the quicksilver is poured into a vessel, and a stone weighing one hundred pounds is laid upon it, the stone swims on the surface, and cannot depress the liquid, nor break through, nor separate it. If we remove the hundred pound weight, and put on a scruple of gold, it will not swim, but will sink to the bottom of its own accord. Hence, it is undeniable that the gravity of a substance depends not on the amount of its weight, but on its nature.

In the 6th century CE, the Byzantine Alexandrian scholar John Philoponus proposed the theory of impetus, which modifies Aristotle's theory that "continuation of motion depends on continued action of a force" by incorporating a causative force which diminishes over time.

Indian subcontinent 

The Indian mathematician/astronomer Brahmagupta (c. 598c. 668 CE) first described gravity as an attractive force, using the term "gurutvākarṣaṇam (गुरुत्वाकर्षणम्)" to describe it:

The earth on all its sides is the same; all people on the earth stand upright, and all heavy things fall down to the earth by a law of nature, for it is the nature of the earth to attract and to keep things, as it is the nature of water to flow ... If a thing wants to go deeper down than the earth, let it try. The earth is the only low thing, and seeds always return to it, in whatever direction you may throw them away, and never rise upwards from the earth.

Another famous Indian mathematician and astronomer Bhaskaracharya II (c. 1114c. 1185) describes gravity as an inherent attractive property of Earth in the section Golādhyāyah (On Spherics) of his treatise Siddhānta Shiromani:

The property of attraction is inherent in the Earth. By this property the Earth attracts any unsupported heavy thing towards it: The thing appears to be falling but it is in a state of being drawn to Earth. ... It is manifest from this that ... people situated at distances of a fourth part of the circumferance [of earth] from us or in the opposite hemisphere, cannot by any means fall downwards [in space].

Islamic world

In the 11th century CE, Persian polymath Ibn Sina (Avicenna) agreed with Philoponus' theory that "the moved object acquires an inclination from the mover" as an explanation for projectile motion. Ibn Sina then published his own theory of impetus in The Book of Healing (c. 1020). Unlike Philoponus, who believed that it was a temporary virtue that would decline even in a vacuum, Ibn Sina viewed it as a persistent, requiring external forces such as air resistance to dissipate it. Ibn Sina made distinction between 'force' and 'inclination' (mayl), and argued that an object gained mayl when the object is in opposition to its natural motion. He concluded that continuation of motion is attributed to the inclination that is transferred to the object, and that object will be in motion until the mayl is spent.

Another 11th-century Persian polymath, Al-Biruni, proposed that heavenly bodies have mass, weight, and gravity, just like the Earth. He criticized both Aristotle and Ibn Sina for holding the view that only the Earth has these properties. The 12th-century scholar Al-Khazini suggested that the gravity an object contains varies depending on its distance from the centre of the universe (referring to the centre of the Earth). Al-Biruni and Al-Khazini studied the theory of the centre of gravity, and generalized and applied it to three-dimensional bodies. They also founded the theory of ponderable lever, and created the science of gravity. Fine experimental methods were also developed for determining the specific gravity or specific weight of objects, based the theory of balances and weighing.

In the 12th century, Abu'l-Barakāt al-Baghdādī adopted and modified Ibn Sina's theory on projectile motion. In his Kitab al-Mu'tabar, Abu'l-Barakat stated that the mover imparts a violent inclination (mayl qasri) on the moved and that this diminishes as the moving object distances itself from the mover. According to Shlomo Pines, al-Baghdādī's theory of motion was "the oldest negation of Aristotle's fundamental dynamic law [namely, that a constant force produces a uniform motion], [and is thus an] anticipation in a vague fashion of the fundamental law of classical mechanics [namely, that a force applied continuously produces acceleration]."

European Renaissance

In the 14th century, both the French philosopher Jean Buridan and the Merton College of Oxford rejected the Aristotelian concept of gravity. They attributed the motion of objects to an impetus (akin to momentum), which varies according to velocity and mass; Buridan was influenced in this by Ibn Sina's Book of Healing. Buridan and the philosopher Albert of Saxony (c. 1320–1390) adopted Abu'l-Barakat's theory that the acceleration of a falling body is a result of its increasing impetus. Influenced by Buridan, Albert developed a law of proportion regarding the relationship between the speed of an object in free fall and the time elapsed. He also theorized that mountains and valleys are caused by erosion—displacing the Earth's centre of gravity. Also in that century, the Merton College developed the mean speed theorem, which was proved by Nicole Oresme (c. 1323–1382) and would be influential in later gravitational equations.

Leonardo da Vinci (1452–1519) made drawings recording the acceleration of falling objects. He wrote that the "mother and origin of gravity" is energy. He describes two pairs of physical powers which stem from a metaphysical origin and have an effect on everything: abundance of force and motion, and gravity and resistance. He associates gravity with the 'cold' classical elements, water and earth, and calls its energy infinite. In Codex Arundel, Leonardo recorded that if a water-pouring vase moves transversally (sideways), simulating the trajectory of a vertically falling object, it produces a right triangle with equal leg length, composed of falling material that forms the hypotenuse and the vase trajectory forming one of the legs. On the hypotenuse, Leonardo noted the equivalence of the two orthogonal motions, one effected by gravity and the other proposed by the experimenter. By 1514, Nicolaus Copernicus had written an outline of his heliocentric model, in which he stated that Earth's centre is the centre of both its rotation and the orbit of the Moon. In 1533, German humanist Petrus Apianus described the exertion of gravity:

Since it is apparent that in the descent [along the arc] there is more impediment acquired, it is clear that gravity is diminished on this account. But because this comes about by reason of the position of heavy bodies, let it be called a positional gravity [i.e. gravitas secundum situm]

By 1544, according to Benedetto Varchi, the experiments of at least two Italians had dispelled the Aristotelian claim that objects fall proportionately to their weight. In 1551, Domingo de Soto suggested that objects in free fall accelerate uniformly. This idea was subsequently explored in more detail by Galileo Galilei, who derived his kinematics from the 14th-century Merton College and Jean Buridan, and possibly De Soto as well. Galileo successfully applied mathematics to the acceleration of falling objects, correctly hypothesizing in a 1604 letter to Paolo Sarpi that the distance of a falling object is proportional to the square of the time elapsed. Galileo suggested in his Two New Sciences (1638) that the slight variance of speed of falling objects of different mass was due to air resistance, and that objects would fall completely uniformly in a vacuum.

A disciple of Galileo, Evangelista Torricelli reiterated Aristotle's model involving a gravitational centre, adding his view that a system can only be in equilibrium when the common centre itself is unable to fall.

Johannes Kepler in his "Astronomia nova" (1609) proposed an attractive force of limited radius between any "kindred" bodies:
Gravity is a mutual corporeal disposition among kindred bodies to unite or join together; thus the earth attracts a stone much more than the stone seeks the earth. (The magnetic faculty is another example of this sort).... If two stones were set near one another in some place in the world outside the sphere of influence of a third kindred body, these stones, like two magnetic bodies, would come together in an intermediate place, each approaching the other by a space proportional to the bulk [moles] of the other....

European Enlightenment

The relation of the distance of objects in free fall to the square of the time taken was confirmed by Francesco Maria Grimaldi and Giovanni Battista Riccioli between 1640 and 1650. They also made a calculation of the Gravity of Earth constant by recording the oscillations of a pendulum.

Mechanical explanations

In 1644, René Descartes proposed that no empty space can exist and that a continuum of matter causes every motion to be curvilinear. Thus, centrifugal force thrusts relatively light matter away from the central vortices of celestial bodies, lowering density locally and thereby creating centripetal pressure. Utilizing aspects of this theory, between 1669 and 1690, Christiaan Huygens designed a mathematical vortex model. In one of his proofs, he shows that the distance elapsed by an object dropped from a spinning wheel will increase proportionally to the square of the wheel's rotation time. In 1671, Robert Hooke speculated that gravitation is the result of bodies emitting waves in the aether. Nicolas Fatio de Duillier (1690) and Georges-Louis Le Sage (1748) proposed a corpuscular model using some sort of screening or shadowing mechanism. In 1784, Le Sage posited that gravity could be a result of the collision of atoms, and in the early 19th century, he expanded Daniel Bernoulli's theory of corpuscular pressure to the universe as a whole. A similar model was later created by Hendrik Lorentz (1853–1928), who used electromagnetic radiation instead of corpuscles.

English mathematician Isaac Newton utilized Descartes' argument that curvilinear motion constrains inertia, and in 1675, argued that aether streams attract all bodies to one another. Newton (1717) and Leonhard Euler (1760) proposed a model in which the aether loses density near mass, leading to a net force acting on bodies. Further mechanical explanations of gravitation (including Le Sage's theory) were created between 1650 and 1900 to explain Newton's theory, but mechanistic models eventually fell out of favor because most of them lead to an unacceptable amount of drag (air resistance), which was not observed. Others violate the energy conservation law and are incompatible with modern thermodynamics.

Newton's law

In 1679, Robert Hooke wrote to Isaac Newton of his hypothesis concerning orbital motion, which partly depends on an inverse-square force. In 1684, both Hooke and Newton told Edmond Halley that they had proven the inverse-square law of planetary motion, in January and August, respectively. While Hooke refused to produce his proofs, Newton was prompted to compose De motu corporum in gyrum ('On the motion of bodies in an orbit'), in which he mathematically derives Kepler's laws of planetary motion. In 1687, with Halley's support (and to Hooke's dismay), Newton published Philosophiæ Naturalis Principia Mathematica (Mathematical Principles of Natural Philosophy), which hypothesizes the inverse-square law of universal gravitation. In his own words:I deduced that the forces which keep the planets in their orbs must be reciprocally as the squares of their distances from the centres about which they revolve; and thereby compared the force requisite to keep the moon in her orb with the force of gravity at the surface of the earth; and found them to answer pretty nearly.

Newton's original formula was:

where the symbol  means "is proportional to". To make this into an equal-sided formula or equation, there needed to be a multiplying factor or constant that would give the correct force of gravity no matter the value of the masses or distance between them (the gravitational constant). Newton would need an accurate measure of this constant to prove his inverse-square law. This was first performed by Henry Cavendish in 1797.

In Newton's theory (rewritten using more modern mathematics) the density of mass  generates a scalar field, the gravitational potential  in joules per kilogram, by

Using the Nabla operator  for the gradient and divergence (partial derivatives), this can be conveniently written as:

This scalar field governs the motion of a free-falling particle by:

At distance r from an isolated mass M, the scalar field is

The Principia sold out quickly, inspiring Newton to publish a second edition in 1713. The treatise inspired the French philosopher Voltaire to write his own book explaining aspects of it in 1738, which helped to popularize Newton's theory. In 1755, Prussian philosopher Immanuel Kant published a cosmological manuscript based on Newtonian principles, in which he develops the nebular hypothesis. In 1788, Joseph-Louis Lagrange introduced an improved formulation of classical mechanics. Neither version takes relativistic effects into account, as these had not yet been discovered. Even so, Newton's theory is thought to be exceptionally accurate in the limit of weak gravitational fields and low speeds.

Newton's theory enjoyed its greatest success when it was used to predict the existence of Neptune based on motions of Uranus that could not be accounted by the actions of the other planets. Calculations by John Couch Adams and Urbain Le Verrier both predicted the general position of the planet. In 1846, Le Verrier sent his position to Johann Gottfried Galle, asking him to verify it. The same night, Galle spotted Neptune near the position Le Verrier had predicted.
By the end of the 19th century, Le Verrier showed that the orbit of Mercury could not be accounted for entirely under Newtonian gravity, and all searches for another perturbing body (such as a planet orbiting the Sun even closer than Mercury) were fruitless.

At the end of the 19th century, many tried to combine Newton's force law with the established laws of electrodynamics (like those of Wilhelm Eduard Weber, Carl Friedrich Gauss, and Bernhard Riemann) in order to explain the anomalous perihelion precession of Mercury. In 1890, Maurice Lévy succeeded in doing so by combining the laws of Weber and Riemann, whereby the speed of gravity is equal to the speed of light. In another attempt, Paul Gerber (1898) succeeded in deriving the correct formula for the perihelion shift (which was identical to the formula later used by Albert Einstein). These hypotheses were rejected because of the outdated laws they were based on, being superseded by those of James Clerk Maxwell.

Modern era

In 1900, Hendrik Lorentz tried to explain gravity on the basis of his ether theory and Maxwell's equations. He assumed, like Ottaviano Fabrizio Mossotti and Johann Karl Friedrich Zöllner, that the attraction of opposite charged particles is stronger than the repulsion of equal charged particles. The resulting net force is exactly what is known as universal gravitation, in which the speed of gravity is that of light. Lorentz calculated that the value for the perihelion advance of Mercury was much too low.

In the late 19th century, Lord Kelvin pondered the possibility of a theory of everything. He proposed that every body pulsates, which might be an explanation of gravitation and electric charges. His ideas were largely mechanistic and required the existence of the aether, which the Michelson–Morley experiment failed to detect in 1887. This, combined with Mach's principle, led to gravitational models which feature action at a distance.

Albert Einstein developed his revolutionary theory of relativity in papers published in 1905 and 1915; these account for the perihelion precession of Mercury. In 1914, Gunnar Nordström attempted to unify gravity and electromagnetism in his theory of five-dimensional gravitation. General relativity was proved in 1919, when Arthur Eddington observed gravitational lensing around a solar eclipse, matching Einstein's equations. This resulted in Einstein's theory superseding Newtonian physics. Thereafter, German mathematician Theodor Kaluza promoted the idea of general relativity with a fifth dimension, which in 1921 Swedish physicist Oskar Klein gave a physical interpretation of in a prototypical string theory, a possible model of quantum gravity and potential theory of everything.

Einstein's field equations include a cosmological constant to account for the alleged staticity of the universe. However, Edwin Hubble observed in 1929 that the universe appears to be expanding. By the 1930s, Paul Dirac developed the hypothesis that gravitation should slowly and steadily decrease over the course of the history of the universe. Alan Guth and Alexei Starobinsky proposed in 1980 that cosmic inflation in the very early universe could have been driven by a negative pressure field, a concept later coined 'dark energy'—found in 2013 to have composed around 68.3% of the early universe.

In 1922, Jacobus Kapteyn proposed the existence of dark matter, an unseen force that moves stars in galaxies at higher velocities than gravity alone accounts for. It was found in 2013 to have comprised 26.8% of the early universe. Along with dark energy, dark matter is an outlier in Einstein's relativity, and an explanation for its apparent effects is a requirement for a successful theory of everything.

In 1957, Hermann Bondi proposed that negative gravitational mass (combined with negative inertial mass) would comply with the strong equivalence principle of general relativity and Newton's laws of motion. Bondi's proof yielded singularity-free solutions for the relativity equations.

Early theories of gravity attempted to explain planetary orbits (Newton) and more complicated orbits (e.g. Lagrange). Then came unsuccessful attempts to combine gravity and either wave or corpuscular theories of gravity. The whole landscape of physics was changed with the discovery of Lorentz transformations, and this led to attempts to reconcile it with gravity. At the same time, experimental physicists started testing the foundations of gravity and relativity—Lorentz invariance, the gravitational deflection of light, the Eötvös experiment. These considerations led to and past the development of general relativity.

Einstein (1905, 1908, 1912)
In 1905, Albert Einstein published a series of papers in which he established the special theory of relativity and the fact that mass and energy are equivalent. In 1907, in what he described as "the happiest thought of my life", Einstein realized that someone who is in free fall experiences no gravitational field. In other words, gravitation is exactly equivalent to acceleration.

Einstein's two-part publication in 1912 (and before in 1908) is really only important for historical reasons. By then he knew of the gravitational redshift and the deflection of light. He had realized that Lorentz transformations are not generally applicable, but retained them. The theory states that the speed of light is constant in free space but varies in the presence of matter. The theory was only expected to hold when the source of the gravitational field is stationary. It includes the principle of least action:

Einstein and Grossmann includes Riemannian geometry and tensor calculus.

The equations of electrodynamics exactly match those of general relativity. The equation

is not in general relativity. It expresses the stress–energy tensor as a function of the matter density.

Lorentz-invariant models (1905–1910)
Based on the principle of relativity, Henri Poincaré (1905, 1906), Hermann Minkowski (1908), and Arnold Sommerfeld (1910) tried to modify Newton's theory and to establish a Lorentz invariant gravitational law, in which the speed of gravity is that of light. As in Lorentz's model, the value for the perihelion advance of Mercury was much too low.

Abraham (1912)
Meanwhile, Max Abraham developed an alternative model of gravity in which the speed of light depends on the gravitational field strength and so is variable almost everywhere. Abraham's 1914 review of gravitation models is said to be excellent, but his own model was poor.

Nordström (1912)
The first approach of Nordström (1912) was to retain the Minkowski metric and a constant value of  but to let mass depend on the gravitational field strength . Allowing this field strength to satisfy

where  is the mass when gravitational potential vanishes and,

where  is the four-velocity and the dot is a differential with respect to time.

The second approach of Nordström (1913) is remembered as the first logically consistent relativistic field theory of gravitation ever formulated. (notation from Pais not Nordström):

where  is a scalar field,

This theory is Lorentz invariant, satisfies the conservation laws, correctly reduces to the Newtonian limit and satisfies the weak equivalence principle.

Einstein and Fokker (1914)
This theory is Einstein's first treatment of gravitation in which general covariance is strictly obeyed. Writing:

they relate Einstein–Grossmann to Nordström. They also state:

That is, the trace of the stress energy tensor is proportional to the curvature of space.

Between 1911 and 1915, Einstein developed the idea that gravitation is equivalent to acceleration, initially stated as the equivalence principle, into his general theory of relativity, which fuses the three dimensions of space and the one dimension of time into the four-dimensional fabric of spacetime. However, it does not unify gravity with quanta—individual particles of energy, which Einstein himself had postulated the existence of in 1905.

General relativity

In general relativity, the effects of gravitation are ascribed to spacetime curvature instead of to a force. The starting point for general relativity is the equivalence principle, which equates free fall with inertial motion. The issue that this creates is that free-falling objects can accelerate with respect to each other. To deal with this difficulty, Einstein proposed that spacetime is curved by matter, and that free-falling objects are moving along locally straight paths in curved spacetime. More specifically, Einstein and David Hilbert discovered the field equations of general relativity, which relate the presence of matter and the curvature of spacetime. These field equations are a set of 10 simultaneous, non-linear, differential equations. The solutions of the field equations are the components of the metric tensor of spacetime, which describes its geometry. The geodesic paths of spacetime are calculated from the metric tensor.

Notable solutions of the Einstein field equations include:
 The Schwarzschild solution, which describes spacetime surrounding a spherically symmetrical non-rotating uncharged massive object. For objects with radii smaller than the Schwarzschild radius, this solution generates a black hole with a central singularity.
 The Reissner–Nordström solution, in which the central object has an electrical charge. For charges with a geometrized length less than the geometrized length of the mass of the object, this solution produces black holes with an event horizon surrounding a Cauchy horizon.
 The Kerr solution for rotating massive objects. This solution also produces black holes with multiple horizons.
 The cosmological Robertson–Walker solution, which predicts the expansion of the universe.

General relativity has enjoyed much success because its predictions (not called for by older theories of gravity) have been regularly confirmed.  For example:
 General relativity accounts for the anomalous perihelion precession of Mercury.
 Gravitational lensing was first confirmed in 1919, and has more recently been strongly confirmed through the use of a quasar which passes behind the Sun as seen from the Earth.
 The expansion of the universe (predicted by the Robertson–Walker metric) was confirmed by Edwin Hubble in 1929.
 The prediction that time runs slower at lower potentials has been confirmed by the Pound–Rebka experiment, the Hafele–Keating experiment, and the GPS.
 The time delay of light passing close to a massive object was first identified by Irwin Shapiro in 1964 in interplanetary spacecraft signals.
 Gravitational radiation has been indirectly confirmed through studies of binary pulsars such as PSR 1913+16.
 In 2015, the LIGO experiments directly detected gravitational radiation from two colliding black holes, making this the first direct observation of both gravitational waves and black holes.

It is believed that neutron star mergers (since detected in 2017) and black hole formation may also create detectable amounts of gravitational radiation.

Quantum gravity

Several decades after the discovery of general relativity, it was realized that it cannot be the complete theory of gravity because it is incompatible with quantum mechanics. Later it was understood that it is possible to describe gravity in the framework of quantum field theory like the other fundamental forces. In this framework, the attractive force of gravity arises due to exchange of virtual gravitons, in the same way as the electromagnetic force arises from exchange of virtual photons. This reproduces general relativity in the classical limit, but only at the linearized level and postulating that the conditions for the applicability of Ehrenfest theorem holds, which is not always the case. Moreover, this approach fails at short distances of the order of the Planck length.

Theoretical models such as string theory and loop quantum gravity are current candidates for a possible 'theory of everything'.

See also
 Anti-gravity
 History of physics

References
Footnotes

Citations

Sources

Theories of gravity
History of physics